John Saxton may refer to:

 John Saxton (physicist) (1914–1980), British physicist
 John Saxton (priest) (d. 1382), canon of Windsor
 John Saxton (settler) (1807–1866), New Zealand diarist and early Nelson settler

See also
 John Sexton (disambiguation)